Dhaka is the capital of Bangladesh, and one of top megacity of the world. It is also called City of Mosque (মসজিদের শহর). Here is a list of places of worship in Dhaka city.

Mosque
 Baitul Mukarram
 Kakrail Mosque
 Lalbagh Fort Mosque
 Khan Mohammad Mridha Mosque
 Star Mosque
 Kartalab Khan Mosque
 Baitur Rauf
 Sat Gambuj Mosque
 Shaista Khan Mosque
 Qassabtuly Mosque
 Musa Khan Mosque
 Shahbaz Khan Mosque
 Chawkbazar Shahi Mosque
 Nakhaklpara Sapra Mosque
 Allakuri Mosque
 Azimpur Mosque
 Katabon Mosque
 Binat Bibi Mosque
 Gulshan Society Mosque
 Sobhanbag Mosque and Madrasa Complex

Church
 Armenian Church
 Holy Rosary Church
 Saint Thomas Church
 Saint Mary's Cathedral

Hindu Temple
 Dhakeshwari Temple
 Joy Kali Temple
 Ramna Kali Mandir
 Raksha Kali Mandir
 Shiddeswari Kali Temple
 Ganesh Temple
 Tapoban Temple

Buddhist Temple
 Kamalapur Dharmarajika Bauddha Vihara
 Buddhist Monastery, Merul Badda
 Shakyamuni Buddhist Temple
 Bangladesh Buddho Mohabihar

Gurudwara
 Gurdwara Nanak Shahi
 Gurudwara Sangat Tola

See also
 List of districts and suburbs of Dhaka

References

Places of worship
Places of worship